The electoral wards of Belfast are subdivisions of the city, used primarily for statistics and elections. Belfast had 51 wards from May 1973, which were revised in May 1985 and again in May 1993. The number of wards was increased to 60 with the 2014 changes in local government. Wards are the smallest administrative unit in Northern Ireland and are set by the Local Government Boundaries Commissioner and reviewed every 8–12 years.

Wards are used to create constituencies for local government authorities, the Northern Ireland Assembly and the House of Commons of the United Kingdom. In elections to Belfast City Council, the 60 wards are split into ten District Electoral Areas, each of which contains between five and seven wards, with the number of councillors it elects equal to the number of wards it contains. The constituencies for elections to the House of Commons and the Assembly are coterminous and are created by amalgamating wards into larger areas, with the city's wards split between the four 'Belfast' constituencies, although these also contain wards from bordering local authorities.

The use of wards for statistical purposes by the Northern Ireland Statistics and Research Agency (NISRA) has changed since the creation of 'Census Output Areas' (5022 in total) and 'Super Output Areas' (890 in total), which were created to address the variance in size of the 582 wards across Northern Ireland. Each ward contains several Super Output Area, which in turn are made up of a number of Census Output Areas.

District Electoral Areas
The wards were redrawn for the 2014 elections.   The table below shows the divisions prior to the reorganization.

Note: data for DEAs in the above table is based on aggregating the referenced figures for the relevant wards in the table below.

List of Wards

Location of Wards

History
From 1928 until May 1973, Belfast was divided into 15 wards, each represented by a total of four aldermen or councillors. The 15 wards were Duncairn, Dock, Clifton, Shankill, Court, Woodvale, Smithfield, Falls, Saint Anne's, Saint George's, Windsor, Cromac, Ormeau, Pottinger and Victoria.

By the early 1970s, population shifts had resulted in significant differences in the electorates of the wards. Although the wards continued to have four representatives on Belfast City Council, electorates varied from less than 5,000 in the smallest ward, Smithfield, to almost 40,000 in the largest ward, Victoria. The review of local government which took place in the early 1970s expanded Belfast to take in some of the newer housing estates on the fringes of the city and attempted to equalise electorates. Initially, Belfast was to have been divided into 52 wards. Following a public review, one ward, Tullycarnet, was excluded from Belfast and became instead the Castlereagh wards of Tullycarnet and Gilnahirk. The remaining 51 wards were intended to elect one member each using the first past the post electoral system. The reintroduction of the single transferable vote method of election meant that a different system was required. The 51 wards were therefore grouped into 8 electoral areas, distinguished by letters, with each electoral area returning either 6 or 7 councillors.

By the early 1980s, population shifts, demolition of some the older housing estates and residential flight caused by the Troubles had again led to substantial disparities in the electorates of the wards. Some wards in inner city Belfast such as Crumlin had lost over 70% of their population. The review of local government which took place from 1982 to 1984 created 51 new wards, many new or substantially different from their namesakes. The initial proposals, published in 1983, survived unchanged with a few exceptions. The proposed Peter's Hill ward was renamed Saint Anne's. The Donegall ward, one of the few unchanged wards, was renamed Blackstaff. In inner south Belfast, the Saint George's, University and Cromac wards were to have been replaced with an eastern ward, to be called Linenhall, and a western ward, to be called College. Following public inquiries, the wards were replaced with a southern ward, Botanic, and a northern ward, Shaftesbury, which merged the former Cromac and Saint George's wards. As in 1973, these wards were grouped into electoral areas electing between 5 and 7 councillors.

A further review took place in 1991–1992 and compared to the review of the 1980s, saw minor changes. In the Court electoral area, the existing Shankill ward was split between three other wards. One of these three wards which gained territory, Saint Anne's, having lost its eponymous area to the Duncairn ward, assumed the Shankill name. Initially the number of wards was to have been cut to 50, however after a public inquiry, a new 51st ward was created. Most of the existing Finaghy ward was renamed Musgrave, while a new Finaghy ward was created from the southern parts of the older Finaghy ward and the Upper Malone ward, which compensated by gaining territory from Malone and Stranmillis wards.

Former Wards (May 1973 to April 1985)

See also
Belfast City Council
Belfast City Council elections, May 2011
Local government in Northern Ireland
Members of Belfast City Council
Subdivisions of Belfast

References

 
Belfast-related lists
Belfast